The Pays de Fayence is a 'communauté de communes' made up of 9 communes in the departement Var, southeastern France. Its seat is in the town Fayence. Its area is 401.9 km2, and its population was 28,266 in 2019.

Composition
The communauté de communes consists of the following 9 communes:

Bagnols-en-Forêt
Callian
Fayence
Mons
Montauroux
Saint-Paul-en-Forêt
Seillans
Tanneron
Tourrettes

References

Fayence
Fayence